is a trans-Neptunian object on an eccentric orbit in the outermost region of the Solar System, approximately  in diameter. It was discovered on 16 May 1999, by French astronomer Audrey Delsanti and Oliver Hainaut at ESOs La Silla Observatory in northern Chile. The very reddish object is a dwarf planet candidate and has a rotation period of 11.7 hours.

Orbit and classification 

The minor planet orbits the Sun at a distance of 34–65 AU once every 346 years (126,383 days; semi-major axis of 49.29 AU). Its orbit has an eccentricity of 0.31 and an inclination of 25° with respect to the ecliptic.

Numbering and naming 

This minor planet was numbered by the Minor Planet Center on 26 May 2002. As of 2019, it has not been named.

Physical characteristics 

 has two solutions of its rotation period of 6 and 12 hours, respectively, and an albedo of 0.20.

References

External links 
 "TNOs are Cool": A Survey of the Transneptunian Region IV - Size/albedo characterization of 15 scattered disk and detached objects observed with Herschel Space Observatory-PACS
 List of Transneptunian Objects, Minor Planet Center
 Asteroid Lightcurve Database (LCDB), query form (info )
 
 

040314
Discoveries by Audrey C. Delsanti
Discoveries by Olivier R. Hainaut
19990516